In probability theory, to obtain a nondegenerate limiting distribution of the extreme value distribution, it is necessary to "reduce" the actual greatest value by applying a linear transformation with coefficients that depend on the sample size.

If  are independent random variables with common probability density function

 

 

To distinguish the limiting cumulative distribution function from the "reduced" greatest value from F(x), we will denote it by G(x). It follows that G(x) must satisfy the functional equation

 

This equation was obtained by Maurice René Fréchet and also by Ronald Fisher.

Boris Vladimirovich Gnedenko has shown there are no other distributions satisfying the stability postulate other than the following:

 Gumbel distribution for the minimum stability postulate
 If  and  then  where  and 
 In other words, 
 Extreme value distribution for the maximum stability postulate
 If  and  then  where  and 
 In other words, 
 Fréchet distribution for the maximum stability postulate
 If  and  then  where  and 
 In other words,

References

Stability (probability)
Extreme value data